Paul Benavides (born 5 November 1964) is a Mexican former pole vaulter.

He finished fourth at the 1995 Pan American Games. He also competed at the 1993 and 1995 World Championships without reaching the final.

His personal best jump was 5.72 metres, achieved in June 1994 in El Paso. This was the Mexican record for many years. It was surpassed by Giovanni Lanaro in 2007.

References

1964 births
Living people
Mexican male pole vaulters
World Athletics Championships athletes for Mexico
Athletes (track and field) at the 1995 Pan American Games
Pan American Games competitors for Mexico